Rubia peregrina, the common wild madder, is a herbaceous perennial  plant species belonging to the bedstraw and coffee family Rubiaceae.

Etymology
The genus name Rubia derives from the Latin  meaning "red", as the roots of some species (mainly Rubia tinctorum) have been used since ancient times as a vegetable red dye. The specific epithet is the Latin adjective  meaning "foreign, alien, exotic, strange."

Description
The evergreen leaves are sessile, glossy, leathery, oval-lanceolate and toothed on the margins. They are arranged in whorls, usually with five or more leaves radiating from a single node. The small flowers have five petals and are pale green-yellowish, about 5–7 mm in diameter, arranged at the top of long stalks. The flowering period extends from April through June. The hermaphroditic flowers are pollinated by insects (entomogamy).

Distribution
It is mainly present in Mediterranean Europe (Portugal, Spain, France, Italy, Greece and former Yugoslavia), in Great Britain and in North Africa.

Habitat
This stress resistant weed is typical of Mediterranean scrub. It grows in thickets, bushes, hedges, stony grounds and along the roads and paths.

Gallery

Synonyms 
Rubia anglica Huds. (1762)
Rubia angustifolia L. (1767)
Rubia lucida L. (1767)
Rubia bocconii Petagna (1787)
Rubia longifolia Poir.
Rubia splendens Hoffmanns. & Link (1824)
Rubia requienii Duby (1830)
Rubia dalmatica Scheele (1844)
Rubia angustifolia var. requienii (Duby) Nyman (1879)
Rubia peregrina var. dalmatica (Scheele) Nyman (1879)
Rubia peregrina var. lucida (L.) Nyman (1879)
Rubia peregrina var. splendens (Hoffmanns. & Link) Nyman (1879)
Rubia erratica Bubani (1899)
Rubia reiseri Halácsy ex Hayek (1930)
Rubia peregrina subsp. longifolia (Poir.) O.Bolòs (1969)
Rubia peregrina var. requienii (Duby) Cardona (1974)
Rubia peregrina subsp. requienii (Duby) Cardona & Sierra (1980)
Rubia agostinhoi  Dans. et Silva
Rubia peregrina subsp. agostinhoi (Dans. et Silva) Valdés et G.López

References

 Herbarium virtual
 Plants for a Future
M. Antonielli, M. Ceccarelli, N. Pocceschi Rubia peregrina L.: a stress resistant weed

External links

 Schede di botanica
 Acta plantarum

peregrina
Plants described in 1753
Taxa named by Carl Linnaeus